Miranda Vidak (Miranda Viđak in Croatian) is a Croatian-American writer, designer, founder & CEO of Moodytwin, and former model.

Early life 
Miranda Vidak was born and raised in Split, Croatia. She was a competitive swimmer and a national junior team basketball player until the knee injury forced her to leave sports. She went on to become a model, while studying Fine Arts & Graphic Design. She moved to United States to continue her modeling career and education at Fashion Institute of Technology in New York City, where she studied Advertising and Marketing Communications.

Career 
After a decade long experience in fashion industry both in front and behind the camera, in 2009 Vidak launched Moodytwin, a custom  clothing and accessories brand. In 2014, Vidak expanded Moodytwin into a lifestyle brand. Being the Hollywood insider, at the crossroads of entertainment & fashion, Vidak opened her creative studio  in 2015, where she develops fashion, graphic and digital campaigns for clothing lines, brands, celebrity clients and music bands. Vidak is an avid blogger & writer.

In 2007, Vidak appeared in six issues of FHM Magazine  around the world, including two covers; FHM Cover Girl Croatia – July 2007, FHM Cover Girl Serbia – April 2007, FHM Russia – August 2007, FHM Thailand – September 2007, FHM Mexico – October 2007, FHM Germany – November 2007. In 2007, she was voted the 46-th sexiest woman in the world by FHM Magazine.

In 2008, Vidak started writing her popular blog  discussing her experiences with tabloid media, which gained her even more notoriety among tabloid journalists. She documented her experiences in a sarcastic tone, shedding a light on the corrupt practices of unethical media and the dangerous effects it can have on mental health. Today, her blog analyzes culture, TV, social issues, relationships, and personal growth. She's a columnist for Medium and BURO, a world-leading luxury digital destination for the affluent millennial.

Personal life 
Vidak moved to New York in 1998. and relocated to Los Angeles in 2007. She was often connected in media with Bruce Willis, however, she never confirmed the relationship but claimed friendship. Vidak is known for her articles criticizing tabloid media, and her frequent strife with Croatian and Serbian press.

References

External links 
 
Official Website
Moodytwin

Living people
Businesspeople from Split, Croatia
Croatian female models
Croatian fashion designers
Croatian women fashion designers
Magazine editors
Croatian emigrants to the United States
Women magazine editors
Year of birth missing (living people)
Models from Split, Croatia